Mega Zone is an overhead vertically scrolling shooter released as an arcade video game by Konami in 1983. Mega Zone is similar to Xevious, where the player flies over a landscape of rivers and trees and futuristic enemy emplacements. There are both aerial and ground targets, but unlike Xevious both can be destroyed with the same weapon. At certain points the player can choose either the left or right fork of a branching path.

World record
Yashiro Oda holds the official record for this game with 2,228,650 points.

References

External links
 

1983 video games
Arcade video games
Arcade-only video games
Konami games
Vertically-oriented video games
Vertically scrolling shooters
Konami arcade games
Video games developed in Japan